1995 World Ice Hockey Championships may refer to:
 1995 Men's World Ice Hockey Championships
 1995 World Junior Ice Hockey Championships